"Prime Factors" is the tenth episode of Star Trek: Voyager. This television episode is a science fiction story, set in the 24th century of the Star Trek universe about a spacecraft stranded on the other side of the Galaxy that must make its way back to Earth. The ship is led by Captain Kathryn Janeway who must manage a ragtag crew of Starfleet, Maquis, and aliens; the show aired on UPN between 1995 and 2001.

This teleplay was written by Greg Elliot and Michael Perricone, from a story written by David R. George III and Eric A. Stillwell, and directed by Les Landau. It was broadcast on television on March 20, 1995.

Voyager picks up a distress call and makes contact with a new world and its inhabitants. In addition to major scenes with cast regulars such as Captain Janeway and Ensign Harry Kim, the crew encounters a variety of aliens with Ronald Guttman as Gath, Yvonne Suhor as Eudana, and Andrew Hill Newman as Jaret. Voyager's crew including Martha Hackett as Seska and Josh Clark as Lieutenant Joe Carey also have some screentime.

Plot
Voyager encounters a hedonistic and hospitable race known as the Sikarians and is invited to visit their homeworld. Shore leave is organized, and during the visit, Ensign Kim and a Sikarian transport themselves to another planet, Alastria. Kim deduces that the teleporter device—the trajector—has transported them 40,000 light-years.

Captain Janeway is informed, and asks Gath, the leader of the Sikarians, if the technology could be used to transport Voyager further towards the Alpha Quadrant. Gath states that their laws forbid sharing technology. The crew consider how they can bargain for technology, and Kim remembers that stories are valued by the Sikarians. Janeway takes this into account and offers Voyager'''s entire library of literature if the Sikarians will transport Voyager. Gath promises to discuss the offer with the other Sikarian leaders.

In engineering, Seska, Torres, and Lt. Carey examine the spatial rift caused by the trajector to understand how it works. Later, Kim is approached by a civilian who offers to illegally hand over the technology in exchange for the literature. Janeway is reluctant to authorize an illicit trade, so she beams down to pressure Gath once again, but Gath never intended to accept her offer and orders Voyager to leave. Janeway returns to the ship and orders the recall of all personnel.

Torres, Carey, and Seska have downloaded the library and head to the transporter room. While trying to access the transporter, Tuvok walks in on them — but instead of condemning them, Tuvok beams to the surface and makes the exchange himself. He returns to Voyager with the trajector, instructing the engineering team not to attempt to use it until he has spoken with Janeway. Nevertheless, Seska connects the trajector to a console port in engineering so that they can examine it. They discover that the technology relies on the massive crystalline mantle of the planet as an amplifier, and once they depart, the trajector will be useless. As Voyager is about to depart, Torres and Seska activate the trajector. The field forming around the ship produces anti-neutrinos, which causes the warp core to begin building to a breach. Unable to disengage the trajector from the console, Torres destroys it with a phaser.

Janeway is shocked to discover Tuvok, her friend and counsel, was the senior officer involved in the conspiracy. She lets Torres off with a stern warning and asks Tuvok to consult her before acting.

Reception
Reviewers Lance Parkin and Mark Jones considered the episode a strong one, even though they compared the Sikarians to "refugees from Barbarella" because of their European accents and high culture.

This achieved 7.3 Nielsen points when it was aired in March 1995.

In 2020, The Digital Fix felt this episode had some of the "most ambitious storytelling" in season one of Star Trek: Voyager .

Star Trek: Picard
The Sikarians are referenced again in Star Trek: Picard '', season 1 episode 6, "The Impossible Box". The episode states that the Borg eventually assimilated some number of them and acquired their trajector technology, integrating it into Borg cubes for the quick escape of a Borg Queen.

References

External links
 

Star Trek: Voyager (season 1) episodes
1995 American television episodes
Television episodes directed by Les Landau